Crataegus viridis, the green hawthorn or southern thorn, is a species of hawthorn that is native to the southeastern United States. The tree tends to grow to be 5–15 meters tall. Forms vary considerably, and many desirable ornamental forms could be selected from the wild. The cultivar 'Winter King' is a well-known selection.

References

External links
Green Hawthorn (Crataegus viridis), in Georgia, Southeastern United States
Crataegus viridis, Green Hawthorn - Plant Database - University of Connecticut

viridis
Trees of the Northeastern United States
Trees of the Southeastern United States
Plants described in 1753
Taxa named by Carl Linnaeus
Flora without expected TNC conservation status